Elisa Volpatto (born 2 December 1986) is a Brazilian actress who played the lead role in the HBO Latin America's TV series Woman of Phases.

Career
Born in Nova Prata, a city from Rio Grande do Sul, she studied Performing Arts at the Universidade Federal do Rio Grande do Sul and graduated as an actress in the Teatro Escola de Porto Alegre. Elisa Volpatto appeared in several short films, including Porto Alegre de Quintana, directed by Fabiano de Souza and Gilson Vargas. She won the Best Actress Award in 2010, in the Gramado Cinema Festival, for her role in the short movie Um Animal Menor. Elisa Volpatto played the lead role, Graça, in 2011 HBO Latin America's TV series Mulher de Fases, which was the first comedy series produced by the television network. She won the 2011 APCA awards as Best Newcomer Actress for her work in Mulher de Fases.

Filmography

Television

Cinema

Theater

Accolades

References

External links 
 

Living people
1986 births
People from Rio Grande do Sul
Brazilian actresses
Brazilian stage actresses